The 1963–64 Divizia C was the 8th season of Liga III, the third tier of the Romanian football league system.

League tables

East Series

South Series

West Series

North Series

See also 
 1963–64 Divizia A
 1963–64 Divizia B

References 

Liga III seasons
3
Romania